RFA Brown Ranger (A169) was a fleet support tanker of the Royal Fleet Auxiliary. During the Second World War she played an important role in the Malta Convoys and in Pacific operations. From 24 September to 30 September 1941 Brown Ranger was deployed as part of Force S in Operation Halberd, refuelling the ships of convoy WS 11X, en route from the Clyde to Malta via Gibraltar. Brown Ranger deployed again from Gibraltar on 16 November 1941 as part of Operation Chieftain, returning on 18 November. On 11 June 1942 she was part of Force Y in Operation Harpoon, supplying the escorts of convoy WS 19Z.

She also saw service during the Korean War, from 25 June 1950 to 27 July 1953, along with 18 other Royal Fleet Auxiliary vessels and was awarded the battle honour Korea 1950–52.

She was scrapped at Gijón on 28 May 1975.

References

 

Ranger-class tankers
1940 ships
Ships built by Harland and Wolff